Nelson Luiz Proença Fernandes (14 August 1950 – 18 June 2022) was a Brazilian businessman and politician.

A member of the Brazilian Democratic Movement and Cidadania, he served in the Chamber of Deputies from 1991 to 2011.

Proença died of COVID-19 in São Paulo on 18 June 2022 at the age of 71.

References

1950 births
2022 deaths
20th-century Brazilian businesspeople
21st-century Brazilian businesspeople
Brazilian Democratic Movement politicians
Cidadania politicians
Members of the Chamber of Deputies (Brazil) from Rio Grande do Sul
Pontifical Catholic University of Rio Grande do Sul alumni
People from Porto Alegre
Deaths from the COVID-19 pandemic in São Paulo (state)